Orthocarpus, or owl's-clover,  is a genus of flowering plants in the family Orobanchaceae (broomrapes). They are native to North America. A number of species formerly included in Orthocarpus have been transferred to the genus Castilleja, which includes the plants commonly known as Indian paintbrush.

Like their close relatives in genus Castilleja, Orthocarpus are root hemiparasites, capable of photosynthesis but extracting water and mineral nutrients through attachment to the roots of host plants.
  
Some animal species such as the Edith's checkerspot butterfly use these plants as hosts during ovipositing.

Species
, Plants of the World Online accepted the following species:
Orthocarpus barbatus J.S.Cotton
Orthocarpus bracteosus Benth. 
Orthocarpus cuspidatus Greene  
Orthocarpus holmgreniorum (T.I. Chuang & Heckard) L. M. Shultz & F. J. Smith 
Orthocarpus imbricatus Torr. ex S.Watson
Orthocarpus luteus Nutt. 
Orthocarpus pachystachyus A.Gray
Orthocarpus purpureoalbus A.Gray ex S.Watson
Orthocarpus tenuifolius (Pursh) Benth.   
Orthocarpus tolmiei Hook. & Arn.

References

Orobanchaceae genera
Orobanchaceae